The navigli are a system of interconnected canals in and around Milan, in the Italian region of Lombardy, dating back as far as the Middle Ages.

The system consists of five canals: Naviglio Grande, Naviglio Pavese, Naviglio Martesana, Naviglio di Paderno, Naviglio di Bereguardo. The first three were connected through Milan via the Fossa Interna, also known as the Inner Ring. The urban section of the Naviglio Martesana was covered over at the beginning of the 1930s, together with the entire Inner Ring, thus sounding the death knell for the north-eastern canals. Commercial carrying continued on the Naviglio Grande, but the decline was steady and by the 1960s a project of a fluvial port to reach the Po River and consequentially the Adriatic Sea through the canals was shelved for good.

Today, the canals are mostly used for irrigation. Some tourist navigation options are also available along certain sections.

References

External links
 Martesana Canal - Historic and present pictures
 Inner ring - Historic and present pictures
Darsena - Historic and present pictures

Canals in Lombardy
Waterways of Italy
Transport in Lombardy
Tourist attractions in Milan